The Militia (Ireland) Act 1802 (43 Geo. III, c. 2) was an Act of Parliament of the United Kingdom affecting the Militia, a locally raised force for home defence. It applied only to the Kingdom of Ireland, with the
Militia Act 1802 and Militia (Scotland) Act 1802 applying elsewhere in the country.

Provisions of the Act

The Act brought together a number of the Militia Acts which had been passed during the French Revolutionary Wars (1794-1802), repealing them but broadly re-enacting their content. It provided for a Militia with an established strength of 15,000 men in Ireland (set against 51,489 in England and Wales, and 8,000 in Scotland).

The Irish militia was to be raised entirely from volunteers, unlike units in England, Wales, and Scotland, which were recruited by ballot. This was a deliberate decision to avoid civil unrest. The Lord-Lieutenant of Ireland was empowered to recruit volunteers over a four-month period after the Act was passed, paying a bounty of two guineas to each recruit. Men were liable to serve for five years or, if called into active service in this period, until the Militia was disembodied.

The sum set aside for recruiting was £40,000, enough to recruit 19–20,000 men, though the notional strength was only 15,000. In the event, this was insufficient; the Militia (Ireland) Act 1803 (43 Geo III, c. 33) was passed in April 1803 to double the bounty to four guineas, as not enough volunteers had come forward to make up the desired numbers.

Notes

United Kingdom Acts of Parliament 1802
19th-century military history of the United Kingdom
United Kingdom military law
Repealed United Kingdom Acts of Parliament
British defence policymaking